The Women's Qatar Classic 2015 is the women's edition of the 2015 Qatar Classic, a squash tournament which is a PSA World Series event ($115,000 prize money). The event took place in Doha from 31 October to 6 November. Laura Massaro won her first Qatar Classic trophy, beating Nour El Sherbini in the final.

Prize money and ranking points
For 2015, the prize purse was $115,000. The prize money and points breakdown is as follows:

Seeds

Draw and results

See also
Men's Qatar Classic 2015
Qatar Classic
2015–16 PSA World Series

References

External links
PSA Qatar Classic 2015 website
Qatar Classic 2015 Squashsite website
Qatar Squash Federation website

Squash tournaments in Qatar
Men's Qatar Classic (squash)
Men's Qatar Classic (squash)
2015 in women's squash
Women's sport in Qatar